Azize Erdoğan (born August 5, 1996) is a Turkish women's football  attacking midfielder, who last played in the Women's First League for Ataşehir Belediuespor with jersey number 77. She is a member of the Turkey women's national U-19 team.

Early years
Azize Erdoğan was born in the western Turkish city of Aydın on August 5, 1996. She graduatedfrom İncirliova Sports High School in ner hometown, and began studying at Marmara University in Istanbul.

Playing career

Club

Azize Erdoğan received her license for her hometown club 7 Eylül Gençlik Spor in Aydın on June 16, 2009. She began playing in the 2010–11 season of the Women's Regional League. After one season, the team was promoted to the Women's Second League. She continued to appear until the end of the 2013–14 season- She scored 47 goals in 37 games played for 7 Eylül Gençlik Spor.

By August 2014, Erdoğan signed a contract with the Istanbul-based club Kireçburnu Spor, who competed also in the Women's Second League. Her new team finished the 2014–15 season as runner-up, and were promoted to the Women's  First League. With 35 goals scored, she was the top scorer of the Women's Second League in the 2014–15 season, followed by Hatice Yaşar, who netted 22 goals in total. In the second half of the 2016–17 First League season, Erdoğan transferred to Ataşehir Belediyespor. At the end of the season, she retired.

International
Azize Erdoğan debuted in the Turkey women's national U-19team in the Kuban Spring Tournament appearing in the match against Slovakia on March 6, 2013. She took part at the 2015 UEFA Women's Under-19 Championship qualification Group 4 and Elite round matches.

Career statistics
.

Honours

Club
 Turkish Women's Second League
 Kireçburnu Spor
 Runners-up (1): 2014–15, promotion to the Women's First League

 Turkish Women's First League
 Ataşehir Belediyespor
 Third places (1): 2016–17

Individual
 Turkish Women's Second League 
 Topscorer (35 goals) 2014–15 season with Kireçburnu Spor

References

External links
 

Living people
1996 births
People from Aydın
Turkish women's footballers
Women's association football midfielders
Kireçburnu Spor players
Ataşehir Belediyespor players
21st-century Turkish women